David Lubkeman from North Carolina State University, Raleigh, North Carolina was named Fellow of the Institute of Electrical and Electronics Engineers (IEEE) in 2015 for contributions to power system distribution systems. He holds Ph.D. in Electrical Engineering from Purdue University.

References

20th-century births
Living people
Purdue University College of Engineering alumni
North Carolina State University faculty
Fellow Members of the IEEE
Year of birth missing (living people)
Place of birth missing (living people)
American electrical engineers